Street Music may refer to:

Film and television
Street Music (1936 film), a German film
Street Music (1981 film), an American film
Street Music, a webseries by Kassem G

Music
Street Music (album), a 2006 album by Defari
Street Music, a 2005 album by Redrama
Street Music, Op. 65, a 1977 orchestral composition by William Russo
"Street Music", a song by Dizzy Gillespie from the 1964 The Cool World film soundtrack
Street performance, performing in public places for gratuities

See also
Música de Rua (lit. Street Music), a 1994 album by Daniela Mercury
"Música de Rua" (song), the title song
Street singer (disambiguation)
Street Song (disambiguation)